Deluxe Music Construction Set (DMCS) is a 1986 music composition, notation and playback program for the Amiga and Macintosh. The program was originally released as Will Harvey's Music Construction Set for the Apple II and other computers, but was redesigned (and the Will Harvey name dropped) for the deluxe version. DMCS was created by Geoff Brown and published by Electronic Arts (EA). Ariolasoft published the program in Europe under license from EA.

Summary 
DMCS was the first of a line of music programs for the Amiga to make use of its four voice 8-bit sample playback and MIDI synthesis. This program required  of RAM.

DMCS included Bach's Fugue in G minor "Little".

DMCS was more complex and capable than the first music application that EA made for the Commodore 64, Apple II, Atari and Atari ST computers, Music Construction Set. For example, it allowed users to enter lyrics in with the musical score, though the lyrics were strictly for the user's benefit, as the program did not attempt to "sing" the words.

DMCS was also released for the Macintosh, though it was hampered by its copy protection, which used a low-level code encryption that skirted the Macintosh toolbox, resulting in it becoming incompatible with Macintosh System software when upgraded to System 6.

Unreleased port
In 1986, a port by Randel B. Reiss for the Apple IIGS was written, which uses the built-in Ensoniq wavetable sample-based synthesizer. Screen shots appeared in various catalogues and was scheduled for a fall of 1987 release. The port was never publicly released, but its music engine was used for producing the soundtrack for the Apple IIGS game titles Zany Golf and The Immortal, both of which were written by Will Harvey.

Reception
After testing a beta of the Amiga version, Info stated that Deluxe Music "offers the most accurate standard music notation display and editing features I've ever seen ... it is a flexible, detailed composition program".

See also
Aegis Sonix

References

1986 software
Electronic Arts
Amiga software
Macintosh multimedia software
Scorewriters